Traveler is a horse who is the mascot of the University of Southern California. Traveler appears at all USC home football games in the Los Angeles Memorial Coliseum as well as many other outdoor events, including numerous Rose Parades. The current horse is Traveler IX. Although the Traveler web site describes Traveler as "pure white," most of the horses who have served as Traveler are actually gray horses whose hair coats have become completely white. (Truly white horses are rare.) The rider, dressed as an idealized Trojan warrior, is often mistaken for Tommy Trojan, the Trojan portrayed in USC's famous Trojan Shrine statue; however, the rider is unnamed and simply designated as a Trojan warrior with the horse as the official mascot. On November 6, 2013, the costumed version of Tommy and Traveler were introduced for men's and women's basketball games.

The Coliseum
Until it was renovated in the 1990s, the Coliseum included an Olympic running track going around the football field. This proved to be useful for Traveler, who would gallop around the track after every USC score and pump up the crowd. Once the track was removed, Traveler still made its way around the field but had to move cautiously to avoid people on the sidelines. The horse had a minor collision with a person in 2000, and afterwards had human spotters running in front to clear a path.

Previous mascots
Before Traveler, USC used another mascot, a series of canines known as George Tirebiter. There had also been several previous, unofficial horse mascots making appearances on USC sidelines since 1927, but none were permanent. The idea for the current mascot began during the 1961 Rose Parade, when a USC events director spotted Richard Saukko and his white horse, Traveler, marching in the parade. The university persuaded Saukko to ride his horse during USC football games.

Introduction
Traveler was introduced in the autumn of 1961, during the USC Trojans football team's home opener at the Coliseum, against the Georgia Tech Yellow Jackets. To dress Saukko as a Trojan warrior, USC used its connections to the film industry to procure the costume worn by Charlton Heston in Ben Hur two years earlier. The costume proved to be too heavy for extended use, so Saukko made his own leather uniform for the 1962 season and the same costume has been used since. The name was believed to have been inspired by the gray horse Traveller, ridden by Civil War Confederate general Robert E. Lee, In August 2017 concerns that the horse's name had a connection to Lee led to further research, which revealed that the first Traveler was acquired with his name, spelled with one L, in 1958 after he had become unreliable as a movie horse. On Equinespot.com, Traveler is listed as one of the six most common horse names to begin with the letter T.

Riders
After Saukko retired from riding the horse in 1988, his family continued to provide the successive horses acting as Traveler until 2002. All of Saukko's successors as rider have been USC alumni, including Cass Dabbs, Rick Oas, Tom Nolan, Ardeshir Radpour, Brent Dahlgren, and current riders Chuck O'Donnell and Hector Aguilar.

Different horses
Several horses have been "Traveler" over the years, of breeds ranging from Tennessee Walking horses, to Arabian horses and some crossbred animals. The current mascot, Traveler IX, is a purebred Andalusian horse, owned by Joanne Asman. An eighth Traveler was in training, but according to a post on the Spirit of Troy Facebook account, Traveler 8 died on or about October 8, 2013. "It is with Sadness that I let you all know that Traveler number 8 who many of you did not have the opportunity to meet passed away. He was only 14 years old. For those who had the opportunity to see this bold, arched neck, beautiful creature run on the field for some of the games last year, he will be missed. Most of the fans did not realize when we switched Traveler 7 & Traveler 8 out, but for those who did know, he will be missed. Traveler 7 continues forward for his 11th year as Traveler." Traveler VII was retired as the mascot following the 2017 Rose Bowl Game, with Traveler IX being introduced at the first USC home game of the 2017 season against Western Michigan.

See also
 List of historical horses

References

External links
 Traveler's official site at USC.

Pac-12 Conference mascots
Horse mascots
USC Trojans
Articles containing video clips